Kingdom of XII is the tenth studio album by American southern rock band Molly Hatchet, released in 2000 by the German label SPV. It was reissued in the United States in 2001 by CMC International, a division of Sanctuary Records Group.

Track listing 
 "Heart of the USA" (Bobby Ingram, Phil McCormack) – 4:01
 "Cornbread Mafia" (Ingram, McCormack) – 3:28
 "One Last Ride" (Ingram, McCormack) – 7:47
 "Why Won't You Take Me Home" (Ingram, McCormack, Andy McKinney) – 3:22
 "Turn My Back on Yesterday" (Ingram, McCormack) – 5:04
 "Gypsy Trail" (Ingram, McCormack, John Galvin) – 3:47
 "White Lightning" (Ingram, McCormack, Galvin) – 3:51
 "Tumbling Dice"  (Mick Jagger, Keith Richards) – 3:13
 "Angel in Dixie" (Ingram, McCormack) – 4:08
 "Kickstart to Freedom" (Ingram, McCormack) – 4:37
 "Dreams of Life" (Ingram, McCormack) – 7:12
 "Edge of Sundown" (acoustic version) (Ingram, Galvin, Danny Joe Brown, Kenny McVay, David Bush) – 7:10

2001 CD re-issue bonus track
"Bordertown" (Bryan Bassett) – 4:01

Personnel 
Molly Hatchet
Phil McCormack – lead vocals, harmonica
Bobby Ingram – guitars, acoustic guitar, slide guitar, backing vocals, producer
Bryan Bassett – guitars
John Galvin – keyboards, backing vocals
Andy McKinney – bass, backing vocals
Sean Shannon – drums, percussion

Additional musicians
Russ Maxwell – guitars
Tim Donovan – keyboards
Charlie Daniels – fiddle
Rolf Köhler – backing vocals

Production
 Nikolo Kotzev – engineer, mixing, mastering

References

2000 albums
Molly Hatchet albums
SPV/Steamhammer albums
CMC International albums